Samuel Kendrick Vandervelde (born 12 February 1971) is a mathematician who, along with Sandor Lehoczky and Richard Rusczyk, is most notable for creating the Mandelbrot Competition, and being listed first under "Thanks" in the mathematical textbook  The Art of Problem Solving.

Contributions to mathematics
Vandervelde contributes problems to the USA Math Olympiad. He was a member of the 1989 United States International Mathematical Olympiad team. He was a grader at the Mathematical Olympiad Program, an intensive summer camp that prepares top high school students for the International Math Olympiad. Vandervelde founded the Stanford Math Circle. He was on the math faculty at St. Lawrence University from 2007 to 2015, and is currently the Head of School and math teacher at Proof School, a private day school in San Francisco for kids who love math. He is also a regular instructor at and board member of MathPath, and has published two books, Bridge to Higher Mathematics and Circle in a Box. His educational work has been recognized by the Mathematical Association of America's Edyth May Sliffe Award for high school teaching (2000) and the Henry L. Alder Award for collegiate teaching (2011).

Interests
His other interests include playing soccer, spending time with his two sons, and cooking. He attended Amherst County High School. He received his undergraduate degree from Swarthmore College and doctoral degree from the University of Chicago in June 2004. He currently resides in Palo Alto, California. He is married to Eunice Cheung.

See also
Art of Problem Solving
Mandelbrot Competition

References

External links
Mandelbrot
Art of Problem Solving

1971 births
Living people
20th-century American mathematicians
21st-century American mathematicians